A European record may refer to:

Sports
List of European records in athletics
List of European Athletics Championships records
List of European records in swimming
List of European Championships records in swimming
European Cup and Euroleague records and statistics (basketball)

Football
European football records
European Cup and Champions League records and statistics
England's European Under-21 Football Championship Record

Other
European Institute for Health Records